Marlon Lamont Wayans (born July 23, 1972) is an American actor, comedian, writer, and producer. Wayans began his career portraying a pedestrian in I'm Gonna Git You Sucka (1988). He played in Above the Rim (1994). He went on to regularly collaborate with his brother Shawn Wayans on The WB sitcom The Wayans Bros. (1995–1999), and in the comedy films Scary Movie (2000), Scary Movie 2 (2001), White Chicks (2004), Little Man (2006), and Dance Flick (2009). Wayans had a dramatic role in Darren Aronofsky's critically acclaimed film Requiem for a Dream (2000), which saw his departure from the usual comedies.

Wayans has appeared in other films including Norbit (2007), G.I. Joe: The Rise of Cobra (2009), The Heat (2013), A Haunted House (2013) and its sequel A Haunted House 2 (2014), Naked (2017), Fifty Shades of Black (2016), Sextuplets (2019), and On the Rocks (2020). He partnered with Randy Adams to create What the Funny, an online destination for urban comedy. Wayans created the comedy competition television show Funniest Wins, which aired on TBS in 2014. In 2014, Wayans and his brothers traveled the U.S. with "The Wayans Brothers Tour". In 2017, he began starring in his own NBC sitcom Marlon, which ran for two seasons.

Early life
Wayans was born in New York City, the son of Elvira Alethia (Green), a homemaker and social worker, and Howell Stouten Wayans, a supermarket manager. He was raised in Fulton Houses, a housing project in New York City, the youngest of ten siblings. He is the brother of Nadia, Shawn, Keenen Ivory, Damon, Dwayne, and Kim. His family were Jehovah's Witnesses. Wayans went to Fiorello H. LaGuardia High School of Music & Art and Performing Arts in New York City, the school made famous in Fame. After graduating from high school, he attended Howard University in Washington, D.C., but dropped out after two years.

Career
Between 1992 and 1993, Wayans appeared with his siblings on the sketch comedy show In Living Color. From 1995 until 1999, he co-starred in the WB sitcom The Wayans Bros. with his brother Shawn Wayans. He was originally considered for the role of Robin in the 1992 film Batman Returns, however it was felt that the film featured too many characters, so the character was omitted from that film. Wayans was then formally signed for the role in the 1995 sequel Batman Forever to play opposite Billy Dee Williams as Two-Face, but the mid-production change in directors from Tim Burton to Joel Schumacher would result in both parts being recast and Wayans being paid out (Williams was not yet signed on, but he received a penalty fee as his contract for Batman allowed him the option of reprise), for which he still receives some royalty payments to this day. He was replaced by Chris O'Donnell. In August 2021, a comic book adaptation of the original concept, Batman '89, began publication, by DC Entertainment, using Wayans' likeness for Robin with his permission, their civilian identity renamed Drake Winston. 

Wayans produced the first two films of the Scary Movie series, in which he and Shawn were credited writers and co-stars. Those films were released in 2000 and 2001. In 2000, Wayans appeared as Tyrone C. Love in Requiem for a Dream and as Snails in Dungeons & Dragons. That same year, he and  brother Shawn hosted the 2000 MTV Video Music Awards. Wayans also produced the Nickelodeon cartoon series Thugaboo. In 2017, NBC gave him his own sitcom, Marlon, for a 10-episode run. In September 2017, Marlon got renewed for a second season by NBC, which is now available on Netflix.

Also in September 2017, Variety announced that Wayans would be partnering up with LA-based entertainment company Shots Studios to launch his own YouTube channel. He has appeared in videos alongside creators such as Anwar Jibawi and Hannah Stocking. In 2020, Wayans signed a deal with HBO Max.

Personal life
Wayans began dating Angela Zackary in 1992. They separated in 2013 and were never married. Though he once referred to Zackary as his "ex wife", Wayans said in a 2021 interview that he had never been married before. The pair have two children: Amai Zackery Wayans (b. May 24, 2000), and Shawn Howell Wayans, (b. February 3, 2002).  Wayans was close friends with rapper Tupac Shakur until his death in 1996. He is also a longtime friend of actor Omar Epps.

Filmography

Film

Television

References

External links
 
 
 

1972 births
American people of Malagasy descent
Marlon
African-American male comedians
American male comedians
African-American film producers
Film producers from New York (state)
American male film actors
African-American television producers
Television producers from New York City
American male television actors
American male voice actors
20th-century American male actors
21st-century American male actors
African-American male actors
American sketch comedians
Male actors from New York City
Living people
Comedians from New York City
20th-century American comedians
21st-century American comedians
People from Chelsea, Manhattan
Fiorello H. LaGuardia High School alumni
20th-century African-American people
21st-century African-American people